The black-faced waxbill (Brunhilda erythronotos) is a common species of estrildid finch found in southern Africa. 
It is found in Angola, Botswana, Kenya, Namibia, Rwanda, South Africa, Tanzania, Uganda, Zambia and Zimbabwe. The IUCN has classified the species as being of least concern.

Taxonomy
The black-faced waxbill was formally described in 1817 by the French ornithologist Louis Jean Pierre Vieillot and given the binary name Fringilla erythronotos. The specific epithet combines the Ancient Greek eruthros meaning "red" and
-nōtos meaning "-backed".  The type locality is Kurrichane (Kaditshwene) in the North West province of South Africa. This species was formerly placed in the genus Estrilda. When a molecular phylogenetic study published in 2020 found that Estrilda was paraphyletic, the genus Brunhilda was resurrected for this species and the black-cheeked waxbill.

Two subspecies are recognised:
 B. e. delamerei (Sharpe, 1900) – southwest Uganda, west Kenya to central Tanzania
 B. e. erythronotos (Vieillot, 1817) – Angola and Namibia to Zimbabwe and north South Africa

References

External links
 BirdLife International species factsheet
 Species text in The Atlas of Southern African Birds

black-faced waxbill
Birds of Sub-Saharan Africa
black-faced waxbill
Taxa named by Louis Jean Pierre Vieillot
Birds of East Africa
Taxobox binomials not recognized by IUCN